Juan Ignacio Reyes González (born 15 December 1981) is a Mexican former Paralympic swimmer who is a five-time Paralympic champion, eight-time World champion and three-time Parapan American Games champion. At age five he lost both his arms and his left leg due to a serious illness. He was classified S4, SB2, SM3.

He is a former world record holder for his classification in the 50m backstroke and 100m backstroke events.

References 

Paralympic swimmers of Mexico
Paralympic gold medalists for Mexico
Paralympic silver medalists for Mexico
Paralympic bronze medalists for Mexico
Swimmers at the 2000 Summer Paralympics
Swimmers at the 2004 Summer Paralympics
Swimmers at the 2008 Summer Paralympics
Swimmers at the 2012 Summer Paralympics
Swimmers at the 2016 Summer Paralympics
Swimmers from Mexico City
Mexican amputees
Living people
World record holders in paralympic swimming
Medalists at the World Para Swimming Championships
Medalists at the 2000 Summer Paralympics
Medalists at the 2004 Summer Paralympics
Medalists at the 2008 Summer Paralympics
Medalists at the 2012 Summer Paralympics
1981 births
S4-classified Paralympic swimmers
Mexican disabled sportspeople
Paralympic medalists in swimming
Medalists at the 2003 Parapan American Games
Medalists at the 2011 Parapan American Games
Medalists at the 2015 Parapan American Games
Mexican male backstroke swimmers
Mexican male medley swimmers
Mexican male butterfly swimmers